Jujubinus dispar is a species of sea snail, a marine gastropod mollusk in the family Trochidae, the top snails.

Description
The height of the shell attains 5 mm.

Distribution
This marine species occurs off the Strait of Gibraltar and off Morocco.

References

 Curini-Galletti M. (1982). Note ai Trochidae: VIII. Jujubinus dispar n. sp. Atti della Società Toscana di Scienze Naturali Mem. serie B 89: 87–97

External links
 

dispar
Gastropods described in 1982